Diamond code may refer to:

 Diamond code (genetics), a (wrong) proposal by George Gamow how to denote DNA sequences
 Diamond code (coding theory), a self-complementing arithmetic code in coding theory

See also
 Canadian Diamond Code of Conduct
 Diamond (disambiguation)